Terry Alexander (born March 23, 1947) is an American actor, who is best known for his role as John in George A. Romero's 1985 film Day of the Dead. He had a regular role on the soap opera One Life to Live in the early 1990s, as police chief Troy Nichols. He has also had numerous small roles in films and television shows, along with ads, most notably an AIDS PSA.

Filmography

Film

Television

References

External links 

 

1947 births
Living people
American male film actors
African-American male actors
American male television actors
21st-century African-American people
20th-century African-American people